Agonoscelis puberula, the African cluster bug, is a species of stink bug in the family Pentatomidae. It is native to Africa, but can now found in the Caribbean, Central America, and North America. The earliest record of this species in the Western Hemisphere was from 1985.

References

 

Pentatomidae
Articles created by Qbugbot
Insects described in 1853